Ghost Dance is John Norman's 1970 historical fiction novel wherein a Sioux man and his tradition comes in conflict with a white woman and her civilization as the Wounded Knee Massacre approaches. As with his Gor series, his main body of work, Norman displays both philosophical reaction and an affinity with incorporating historical events with the actions of fictional characters.

Outline
"There was little noticeable, little remarkable about Edward Chance, saving perhaps that he had once shot and killed a man....His craft, medicine, was more than a business with him, more than a professional skill. It was a way of healing his own heart too." In Ghost Dance, it is through Chance's keen eyes and weary heart that readers travel along on a journey of discovery and sorrow. On the run across the plains, Chance stumbles upon Running Horse, a Sioux warrior enacting the sacred and violent ritual of the Sun Dance. Quickly, Chance is pulled into the world of the Sioux people. As their civilization teeters on the brink of destruction, the Sioux perform the mournful and frightening Ghost Dance. Clashes with the white man are rising; the Wounded Knee Massacre approaches, still in the unknown distance; and violence and anger threaten the traditions of a proud and once-great people. Nearby, in her quaint sod house, Miss Lucia Turner awaits the full impact of those clashes. Dust on the horizon signals great change coming to her once-simple life. Lucia will soon become a different kind of woman. With Ghost Dance, author John Norman brings the same vigor and passion of storytelling and imagination that enriches his classic Gor novels to a vivid story of historical upheaval and personal exploration.
First published January 1, 1970.

References

External links
 
 http://www.goodreads.com/book/show/5996308-ghost-dance

1970 American novels
American historical novels
Ballantine Books books